Limestone Coast is a state government region in South Australia

Limestone Coast  may also refer to the following:

 Limestone Coast local service area, a SAPOL organisational unit - refer South Australia Police#Local service areas in South Australia
Limestone Coast Tourism Region, a tourism industry region - refer Regions of South Australia#Tourist regions
Limestone Coast zone (wine), a wine zone in South Australia
Limestone Coast Railway, a defunct tourist railway in South Australia

See also
Limestone (disambiguation)
 Limestone County (disambiguation)
 Limestone Run (disambiguation)
 Limestone Township (disambiguation)